Yvonne Howell (July 31, 1905 – May 27, 2010) was an actress whose career began in silent films.

Biography
Howell's mother was vaudeville performer and silent actress Alice Howell and her father was Benjamin Vincent Shevlin.

In 1930, she became the first wife of then cameraman George Stevens, an Academy Award-winning film director. They divorced in 1947. Their son, George Stevens Jr., was founding director of the American Film Institute. After her film career ended, she was a nurse's aide at Army hospitals in Southern California during World War II and later served as a volunteer tutor.

Howell died aged 104 on May 27, 2010, from cardiac arrest at her residence of Hollywood.

Filmography
 Working Girls (1931)
 Take Me Home (1928) 
 Hop Off (1928) Short
 Great Mail Robbery (1927)
 Somewhere in Sonora (1927) 
 Fashions for Women (1927) 
 The Lady of Lyons, N.Y. (1926) Short
 A Fraternity Mixup (1926) Short
 Flaming Flappers (1925) Short
 Transients in Arcadia (1925) Short
 Harem Follies (1924 ) Short

References

External links
 

1905 births
2010 deaths
20th-century American actresses
Actresses from Chicago
Actresses from Illinois
American centenarians
American film actresses
American silent film actresses
Burials at Forest Lawn Memorial Park (Hollywood Hills)
Women centenarians
21st-century American women